Jean-Bernard Sempastous (born 5 August 1964) is a French politician of La République En Marche! (LREM) who was deputy for Hautes-Pyrénées's 1st constituency in the French National Assembly from 2017 to 2022.

In parliament, Sempastous served as member of the Committee on Economic Affairs. In addition to his committee assignments, he was part of the parliamentary friendship groups with Pakistan and Spain as well as of the French delegation to the Inter-Parliamentary Union (IPU).

At the initiative of Sempastous and Benoît Simian, some twenty LREM deputies who had been elected in rural areas established their interest group within the party's parliamentary group in September 2018.

See also
 2017 French legislative election

References

Living people
Deputies of the 15th National Assembly of the French Fifth Republic
La République En Marche! politicians
Place of birth missing (living people)
Union of Democrats and Independents politicians
1964 births